The 2015–16 Hazfi Cup was the 29th season of the Iranian football knockout competition. Zob Ahan Isfahan was the defending champion. The competition started on 27 August 2015 and the final was played on 29 May 2016. Zob Ahan won the tournament for the second time in a row after defeating Esteghlal in the final.

Participating teams
Totally 80 teams participated in the 2015–16 season. The teams were divided into two main groups.

16 teams of Iran Premier League:

64 teams of Azadegan League, Iran 2nd Division League, and Provincial Leagues:

First stage
In the first stage of "2015–16 Hazfi Cup", 64 teams presented. In this stage one round played, and finally, 16 teams qualified for the second stage.

First round

Second round

Second stage
The 16 teams from Persian Gulf Pro League are entered to competition from the second stage.

Third round (round of 32)

Fourth round (round of 16)

Quarter-Final (1/4 Final - Last 8)

Semi-final (1/2 final – last 4)

Final

Bracket 

Note:     H: Home team,   A: Away team

Top scorers

Last updated: 29 May 2016
Source: hazfi-cup.com

See also 
 Iran Pro League 2015–16
 Azadegan League 2015–16
 Iran Football's 2nd Division 2015–16
 Iran Football's 3rd Division 2015–16
 Iranian Super Cup
 Futsal Super League 2015–16

References

Hazfi Cup seasons
Hazfi Cup
Hazfi Cup